I Stand is the third studio album by American singer-songwriter Idina Menzel and was released on January 29, 2008. The album was produced by Glen Ballard, who co-wrote most of the songs with Menzel.

Promotion

Singles and EPs
The first single, a dance pop version of Defying Gravity, was released in March 2007, even though the track was only included on the UK and iTunes editions of the album. An EP, also titled Defying Gravity, was released two months later, featuring five different remixes of the track. Another version, featuring five DJ versions, was also released. The song Brave was released as the second single in November 2007.

The single Gorgeous was released in December 2007, alongside an EP featuring five remixes of the song. Each remix was edited down for the EP but could be purchased full-length as a single. Three additional remixes of the song were released on a new EP in January 2008, again also all available in longer, single forms. Also, in August 2008, Menzel released the EP Acoustic. The EP features acoustic versions of I Stand, Brave, Gorgeous and Better to Have Loved.

In April 2010, Idina released the EP Idina Menzel, which features album versions of I Stand, Gorgeous and Brave as well as Embraceable You, Defying Gravity, and No Day But Today which were recorded live on her tour.

Tour
To promote the album, Menzel embarked on the I Stand tour on April 1, 2008, in New Brunswick, NJ. Her Concert at Rose Hall at Lincoln Center was filmed for a PBS special on the show Soundstage. The tour ran for four sold out legs before ending on March 29, 2009. She performed a total of 50 concerts on the tour.

Music videos
A music video for "I Stand" was released on her official YouTube channel on August 15, 2008. A music video for "Brave" was also released on the channel and on iTunes.

Reception

The album debuted at #58 in the Billboard 200 making it Menzel's first album to debut on this chart. The album also peaked at #54 on the UK Albums Chart. The single "Gorgeous" reached #3 on Billboard's Hot Dance Club Songs chart for the chart week of March 15, 2008, and "Brave" charted at #19 on the Adult Contemporary chart.

As of March 2014, the album has sold 80,000 copies in the United States.

Track listing
All songs written by Idina Menzel and Glen Ballard except where noted.

Credits and personnel
Vocals - Idina Menzel
Production - Glen Ballard
Credits are adapted from the I Stand album liner notes.

References

External links
 Official Idina Menzel site
 Official Idina Menzel Myspace page

Idina Menzel albums
2008 albums
Albums produced by Glen Ballard